Bagrinovo is a rural locality (a village) in Novoalexandrovskoye Rural Settlement, Suzdalsky District, Vladimir Oblast, Russia. The population was 24 as of 2010. There are 2 streets.

Geography 
Bagrinovo is located 42 km southwest of Suzdal (the district's administrative centre) by road. Zagorye is the nearest rural locality.

References 

Rural localities in Suzdalsky District